Polo Welfring (10 April 1926 – 28 January 1993) was a Luxembourgian gymnast. He competed in eight events at the 1948 Summer Olympics.

References

1926 births
1993 deaths
Luxembourgian male artistic gymnasts
Olympic gymnasts of Luxembourg
Gymnasts at the 1948 Summer Olympics
Sportspeople from Esch-sur-Alzette
20th-century Luxembourgian people